North Shore is a rural municipality within Queens County in Prince Edward Island that was incorporated on September 28, 2018, through an amalgamation of three municipalities. The municipalities that amalgamated were the rural municipalities of Grand Tracadie, North Shore, and Pleasant Grove.

History 
The original Rural Municipality of North Shore was incorporated in 1974.

Communities 
 Covehead
 Covehead Road
 Grand Tracadie
 Pleasant Grove
 Stanhope
 West Covehead

Demographics 

Government 
The Rural Municipality of North Shore was first governed by an interim council comprising an interim mayor (Gordon Ellis) and fifteen interim councillors. The first election for a mayor and six councillors (one for each of six wards) was on November 5, 2018. resulting in the election of a Mayor (Gerard Watts) and six councillors.

References

External links 

Rural municipalities in Prince Edward Island
Populated places established in 2018
2018 establishments in Prince Edward Island